Sautner is a surname. Notable people with the surname include:

Ashton Sautner (born 1994), Canadian ice hockey player
Erich Sautner (born 1991), German footballer
Nick Sautner (born 1977), Australian rules footballer
Thomas Sautner (born 1970), Austrian painter and writer